Hey Nostradamus! is a novel by Douglas Coupland centred on a fictional 1988 school shooting in suburban Vancouver, British Columbia and its aftermath. This is Coupland's most critically acclaimed novel. It was first published by Random House of Canada in 2003. The novel comprises four first-person narratives, each from the perspective of a character directly or indirectly affected by the shooting. The novel intertwines substantial themes, including adolescent love, sex, religion, prayer and grief.

Plot synopsis

The novel follows the stories of victims of a fictional school shooting in North Vancouver in 1988. Coupland has expressed his concern that the killers of the Columbine High School massacre received more focus than the victims; this is his story about the victims of tragedy. The novel is told in four parts, each with a different narrator and focus.

1988: Cheryl
Cheryl Anway, the seventeen year old victim of a shooting massacre at her high school at Delbrook Senior Secondary recounts her life from a liminal state where she is dead but can still hear the prayers and curses of those who are alive. 

Cheryl was pregnant having recently consummated her relationship with her long term boyfriend after they impulsively went to Las Vegas to be married using fake I.D.s as they are still under the age of consent. Both Cheryl and her boyfriend Jason are members of Youth Alive! a group of young Christians.

During the shooting, Cheryl is trapped under a table at the centre of the cafeteria. While the killers are making their way through the crowd, one of them decides that he has had enough with the killing, and wants to stop. The other killers decide that he has become weak, and kill him. They then turn their attention to Cheryl and her friends, and Cheryl becomes the final casualty. Before Cheryl is murdered she witnesses Jason killing one of the gunman with a rock, distracting the other for long enough that the other students are able to subdue and murder the final gunman.

1999: Jason
Eleven years after the massacre Jason struggles to cope with life. He pens a letter to his twin nephews, born after his older brother, Kent, dies in a car accident.

Jason details his current life circumstances working as a carpenter with no true friends and frequently drinking and occasionally blacking out. He reveals that he killed one of the shooters at Delbrook his father was angry with him for being a murderer causing his alcoholic mother to finally leave his abusive and controlling father, Reg, for good. In part because of his father's reaction Jason spends the two weeks after the shooting being investigated by the police and is devastated when his Youth Alive! friends and Cheryl's family turn against him. He is eventually cleared and his mother takes him to New Brunswick to recuperate. 

During one of his present day drinking binges Jason blacks out and comes to in an isolated location aware that he is about to be murdered by Yorgos, a friend of his boss. Jason defends himself and is able to escape from Yorgos but rather than kill him, Jason leaves him injured and even sends help to him. 

At the end of his letter Jason reveals to his nephews that after Kent died his widow Barb asked Jason to impregnate her so that she could pass the child off as Kent's. Jason agreed under the condition that Barb marry him causing he and Barb to go to Las Vegas mimicking the conditions under which he married Cheryl. During their trip to Vegas they are spotted by an acquaintance who Barb later murders to protect her secret. Nine months later the twins are born.

2002: Heather
A court reporter named Heather is in distress after her boyfriend, Jason goes missing. Jason and Heather's relationship began in a Toys "R" Us, with Jason purchasing toys for his nephews and the two bantering over a small toy giraffe and making a world for him. 

After some time Heather receives a call from a woman named Allison claiming to be a fake psychic who has had a real vision. Allison uses catchphrases and words from the secret toy world that Heather and Jason built together causing Heather to believe that Jason is trying to contact her. 

Despite claiming to not want money Allison begins to extort money from Heather to pass on her messages. After a conversation with Reg, Heather decides to try to track down Allison and learns she is a woman named Cecilia. She sees Cecilia with a young woman she assumes is her daughter and believes that Jason and the young woman had been having an affair. When Heather confronts the woman she reveals she is Cecilia's daughter but her mother came to know of the language because Jason came to her with detailed notes wanting to pass along the information if he ever went missing. 

Heather is left wondering about Jason's past, unaware that his decision was prompted by a chance meeting with Yorgos.

2003: Reg
Reg writes an open letter to his son, lamenting that he was a harsh and abusive father under the guise of being a Christian for most of Jason's childhood. 

Reg repents of the way he treated both Jason and Kent and regrets that he destroyed his relationship with a woman named Ruth because he would not divorce Jason's mother. He reveals that though Jason is still missing the RCMP located a shirt of his in the woods and Reg plans to post copies of his letter to trees hoping that somehow Jason will be able to read it.

Characters

 Cheryl
 Cheryl is the first narrator of the story. She is a young grade 12 student, who is a victim of the infamous Delbrook Secondary School massacre. Cheryl grew up in a non-religious environment but becomes religious, through her pursuit of Jason. Her family follows an agnostic mentality, and dislike Cheryl's newfound faith. Cheryl is the last fatality, before Jason storms in, and kills Mitchell with a blunt round object. Cheryl narrates between her former life, and oblivion. Jason and Cheryl wed in Las Vegas, using fake IDs purchased by Jason. She informs Jason that she is pregnant with his child, just a few hours before the massacre occurs.
 Jason
 A quiet and rebellious child from a very religious family. Jason is the narrator of the second section of the novel. His father, Reg, is self-righteous, zealous, and unapologetic, and seems to favour his older brother Kent.
 Reg
 Reg is the narrator of the fourth part of the novel. Born to a strict father, Reg turned to belief as his salvation. Creating a very strict religious code for himself, Reg married and became the father to two children, Kent and Jason. Kent was his father's child, following in his father's religious footsteps. Throughout the novel, Reg undergoes a transformation from narrow fundamentalist to a more open and loving human being.
 Jason's mother
 Jason's mother married Reg when she thought she had found someone who believed in something.  After Reg outcasts Jason, Jason's mother leaves Reg, and takes Jason across Canada. She eventually succumbs to Alcohol-Induced Dementia.
 Kent
 Jason's older brother. He is a leader in the Youth Alive! movement, and looms over his brother as his father's chosen son. Kent is married to Barb, and has two twin sons with her. He dies in the beginning of the second part from a car accident.
 Barb
 Kent's wife, but she is the mother of Jason's twin sons, therefore Kent's nephews.  She and Kent tried to have kids but it didn't work. Since she was desperate to have kids, and Kent dies, she forces Jason to have kids with her. Since, she wanted her kids to look like they're Kent's and her child, so she has sex with Jason so that there are chances of her child looking like Kent. After a fallout with Reg, she remains close to Jason until his disappearance. She is a different person from Kent in many ways, and is very different after the death of Kent.
 Heather
 Jason's romantic partner in the latter half of the novel, Heather is the narrator of the third part of the novel. She is a woman who feels distant and is brought back into the world, just as she brings out Jason from his emotional seclusion.  She creates characters and stories with Jason, which are later provided back to her by a psychic, who Heather believes will bring her back to the missing Jason.

Inspiration
Coupland began to write the novel in December 2001, after a "nightmarish 40-city tour that began on 10 September". This tour took him across the United States and allowed him to experience the "collective sorrow" of the United States. Coupland began to research the Columbine events after this experience.

The quotation from Corinthians that opens the novel was found on a gravestone of one of the children who died in a high school shooting.

History of the novel
An international best-selling novel, the novel was received well by critics.

The novel was released the same week as Gus Van Sant's film Elephant, which also dealt with a Columbine-like situation.

Coupland also had an art installation on the same topic, called "Tropical Birds", which featured 3D versions of the kneeling figure from the front cover of Hey Nostradamus!, and other pieces which features scenes from a school shooting tragedy.

Further reading

See also

 Columbine High School massacre
 Delbrook Senior Secondary School

References

External links
 Book review from The Guardian

2003 Canadian novels
Epistolary novels
Novels by Douglas Coupland
Novels set in Vancouver
Canadian young adult novels
Random House books